The Bute Merthyr Colliery, in Treherbert in the Rhondda Valley, was the first colliery to produce steam coal in the Rhondda valley. A trial pit was dug in 1851, and the colliery was closed in 1926.

Opening
In 1849, Marquess of Bute bought the Cwmsaerbren farm from William Davies for £12,000. W. S. Clarke was employed to sink the first trial shaft in 1851. A second shaft had been sunk by 1855, when the first coal was produced. Progress was slow because all equipment was carried over rough tracks by horse and cart from the Taff Vale Railway's then terminus at Dinas.

References

Collieries in South Wales